Bernard James Mussill (October 1, 1919 – January 27, 2013) was a former Major League Baseball pitcher who played for the Philadelphia Phillies in 1944.

Biography
Born in Bower Hill, Pennsylvania, Mussill was one of many ballplayers who only appeared in the major leagues during World War II. He made his major league debut on April 20, 1944, in a home game against the Brooklyn Dodgers at Shibe Park. 

His season and career totals included sixteen games pitched, all in relief, a 0–1 record with eight games finished, thirteen earned runs allowed in 19 innings, and an ERA of 6.05.

References

External links

The Baseball Bat by Barney Mussill

Major League Baseball pitchers
Baseball players from Pennsylvania
People from Allegheny County, Pennsylvania
Philadelphia Phillies players
1919 births
2013 deaths
Federalsburg A's players